WKDP can refer to:

 WKDP (AM), a radio station (1330 AM) licensed to Corbin, Kentucky, United States
 WKDP-FM, a radio station (99.5 FM) licensed to Corbin, Kentucky, United States